Haswandi, SH, MHum (born 2 April 1961) has been an Indonesian judge, Vice President of the Court of West Jakarta and is now the Chairman of the South Jakarta District Court.

Haswandi was a career judge in public courts under the Supreme Court of the Republic of Indonesia, where he decided and resolved criminal cases and civil cases. He next served as Vice President of the Court of West Jakarta and is now Chairman of the South Jakarta District Court.

References

1961 births
21st-century Indonesian judges
Living people